Sarah Beth Grey (born 10 August 1995; formerly known as Sarah Beth Askew) is a British tennis player.

Grey has a career-high WTA singles ranking of 277, achieved August 2022. She also has a career-high WTA doubles ranking of 143, achieved on 21 October 2019. In her career, Grey has won one singles title and 16 doubles titles on the ITF Circuit.

She made her WTA Tour main-draw debut at the 2019 Dubai Tennis Championships, after receiving a wildcard into the doubles event, partnering Eden Silva.

Personal
Grey was born in Liverpool and grew up in one of its suburbs, West Derby. She lives in Wendover and trains at Halton Tennis Centre in Buckinghamshire. She has three older sisters, a younger brother, and two younger half-brothers.

In February 2022, Grey successfully underwent cardiac ablation surgery to correct a potentially dangerous abnormal heart rhythm.

Playing style
Grey plays left-handed with a two-handed backhand. Although standing at only 5ft 6, she describes her serve as her favourite shot and she enjoys playing on grass courts.

Career statistics

Grand Slam performance timelines

Singles

Doubles

ITF finals

Singles: 1 (title)

Doubles: 34 (16 titles, 18 runner–ups)

Notes

References

External links
 
 

1995 births
Living people
British female tennis players
Sportspeople from Liverpool
Tennis people from Merseyside